Kahriz-e Bid Sorkh (also Romanized as Kahrīz-e Bīd Sorkh; also known as Kahrīz) is a village in Khezel-e Gharbi Rural District, in the Central District of Kangavar County, Kermanshah Province, Iran. At the 2006 census, its population was 36, in 9 families.

References 

Populated places in Kangavar County